Foya District is one of six districts located in Lofa County, Liberia. Foya District is the most populous district in Lofa County, with a population of 73,312 people as of the 2008 census. Foya is predominantly occupied by the Kissi tribe.

Market
Foya town, located in the centre of the Liberian Kissi tribal area, had an important weekly market in the 1970s. The Saturday Foya market day was a very colorful happening and had an important regional economic function. Foya has a market weekend open field market, of the type seen in most rural parts of Africa.

References

External links 

Economy and short modern history

Districts of Liberia
Lofa County